Braubach is a former Verbandsgemeinde ("collective municipality") in the Rhein-Lahn-Kreis, in Rhineland-Palatinate, Germany. Its seat was in Braubach. On 1 July 2012, it merged with the Verbandsgemeinde Loreley.

The Verbandsgemeinde Braubach consisted of the following Ortsgemeinden ("local municipalities"):

 Braubach
 Dachsenhausen 
 Filsen 
 Kamp-Bornhofen
 Osterspai

Former Verbandsgemeinden in Rhineland-Palatinate
Rhein-Lahn-Kreis